Laughing at Death is a 1929 American thriller drama film directed by Wallace Fox for Film Booking Offices of America. The script was written by Frank Howard Clark and Helen Gregg, and the film stars Bob Steele and Natalie Joyce.

Plot 
A young American college athlete meets the prince of a European country while spending time on an ocean liner over his summer vacation. The two look practically identical, and he agrees to help the prince escape a plot against him by switching places for a period of time. Trouble ensues.

Cast 

 Bob Steele as Bob Thornton
 Natalie Joyce as Sonia Petrovich
 Captain Vic as Alexis
 Kai Schmidt as Emil Orloff
 Ethan Laidlaw as Karl Petrovich

References 

1929 films
1929 drama films
1920s American films
1920s thriller drama films
American black-and-white films
American silent feature films
American thriller drama films
Film Booking Offices of America films
Films about lookalikes
Films about princes
Films about vacationing
Films directed by Wallace Fox
Films set on cruise ships
Silent adventure films
Silent thriller films
Silent American drama films